Francis Arthur Powell Aveling MC ComC (25 December 1875 – 6 March 1941) was a Canadian psychologist and Catholic priest. He married Ethel Dancy of Steyning, Sussex in 1925.

Life
Francis Aveling was born at St. Catharines, Ontario 25 December 1875. He went to Bishop Ridley College in Ontario and McGill University before studying at Keble College at the University of Oxford, England. Aveling was received into the Roman Catholic Church by Father Luke Rivington in 1896 and entered the Pontificio Collegio Canadese in Rome. There he earned his doctor of divinity degree. He was ordained to the priesthood in 1899, and served as a curate in Tottenham, before becoming first rector of Westminster Cathedral Choir School. He was also a chaplain at the Cathedral, and to St. Wilfrid's Convent, Chelsea.

In 1910, Aveling obtained a doctor of philosophy degree at the age of 35 from the University of Louvain (his advisor was Albert Michotte), and in 1912 he was recipient of a doctor of science degree from the University of London, and received the Carpenter Medal following his work On the Consciousness of the Universal and the Individual: A Contribution to the Phenomenology of the Thought Process. Subsequently, Aveling received his doctor of letters degree from the University of London.

Career
Aveling taught at University College, London from 1912 as a Lecturer (Assistant Professor), under the leadership of Charles Spearman, until the First World War. During that war he served in France as a chaplain in the British Army, after which he returned to the University of London. In 1922, he transferred to King's College, London where he was promoted to reader (associate professor), and later to professor of psychology. He was an extern examiner in philosophy at the National University of Ireland; and a lecturer in pedagogical methods for the London County Council.

Aveling authored several books. He was the doctoral advisor of Raymond Cattell From 1926 until 1929, Aveling was also a president of the British Psychological Society. Aveling was a member of the Council of the International Congresses, of the Aristotelian Society, of the council and advisory board of the National Institute of Industrial Psychology, of the council of the British Institute of Philosophical Studies and of the Child Guidance Council.

He was a contributor to the Dublin Review, The American Catholic Quarterly Review, Catholic World, The nineteenth Century, The Journal of Psychology, and the Catholic Encyclopedia.

Works

References

Further reading 
 AVELING, Francis Arthur Powell, Who Was Who, A & C Black, 1920–2008; online edn, Oxford University Press, Dec 2007. accessed 28 Jan 2012

1875 births
1941 deaths
Canadian recipients of the Military Cross
Commanders of the Order of Christ (Portugal)
Canadian psychologists
People from St. Catharines
Psychology educators
Royal Army Chaplains' Department officers
Presidents of the British Psychological Society
20th-century Canadian Roman Catholic priests
Academics of University College London
Academics of King's College London
Canadian military chaplains
World War I chaplains
Contributors to the Catholic Encyclopedia
Writers about religion and science